The Vulture Mine was a gold mine and settlement in Maricopa County, Arizona, United States. The mine began in 1863 and became the most productive gold mine in Arizona history. From 1863 to 1942, the mine produced 340,000 ounces of gold and 260,000 ounces of silver.  Historically, the mine attracted more than 5,000 people to the area, and is credited with founding the town of Wickenburg, Arizona. The town that served the mine was known as Vulture City.

History
The Vulture mine began when a prospector from California's gold rush, Henry Wickenburg, discovered a quartz deposit containing gold and began mining the outcrop himself. In 1863, after Henry Wickenburg discovered the Vulture mine, Vulture City, a small mining town, was established in the area. The town once had a population of 5,000 citizens. After the mine closed, the city was abandoned and became a "ghost town". The deposit was later sold to Benjamin Phelps, who represented a group of investors that eventually organized under the name of Vulture Mining Company.

The desert surrounding the Vulture Mine did not give much in the way of produce, so an enterprising individual by the name of Jack Swilling went into the Phoenix Valley and reopened the irrigation canals left by the native peoples. Agriculture was brought back to the valley, and a grain route was established. This grain route still exists today under the name of Grand Avenue. Phoenix, Arizona, grew up around the agricultural center spawned by the needs of the Vulture Mine.

In 1942, the Vulture Mine was shut down by a regulatory agency for processing gold. This was a violation at the time because all resources were to be focused on the war effort. The mine appealed the shut-down order and reopened, but with less vigor. A few years later, the mine closed permanently.

Today the mine and ghost town are privately owned, but tours are offered. Two-hour, dirt path guided walking tours at the historic Vulture mine offers a glimpse of the olden days through a tour of some of the remaining buildings of Vulture City, a booming mining town.

The mine was a Lock-down site on Ghost Adventures on the Travel Channel on October 29, 2010.

Geography
The Vulture Mine is located in Maricopa County at 36610 N. 355th Avenue, Wickenburg, Arizona, United States, Zip code: 85390.

Vulture Mine and Vulture City (Ghost town)
The following are images with a brief description of the Vulture Mine and some of the structures still present in what once was known as Vulture City.

See also
Vulture Mountains
Henry Wickenburg
Vulture City
List of historic properties in Wickenburg, Arizona

References

External links
 Gallery of photos, Vulture Mine
 Vulture Mine Photos and Videos
 Vulture – Ghost Town of the Month at azghosttowns.com

Gold mines in the United States
Mines in Arizona
Mining communities in Arizona
Buildings and structures in Maricopa County, Arizona
Ghost towns in Arizona